Frank Reilly McCabe (June 30, 1927 – April 18, 2021) was an American basketball player who competed in the 1952 Summer Olympics. Born in Grand Rapids, Michigan, McCabe played collegiately at Marquette University. He was part of the American basketball team, which won the gold medal. He played six matches.

References

1927 births
2021 deaths
Basketball players at the 1952 Summer Olympics
Basketball players from Grand Rapids, Michigan
Marquette Golden Eagles men's basketball players
Medalists at the 1952 Summer Olympics
Olympic gold medalists for the United States in basketball
Peoria Caterpillars players
United States men's national basketball team players
American men's basketball players
Forwards (basketball)